Dahlia is a genus of plants.

Dahlia may also refer to:

Animals 

Dahlia (moth), a genus of moths
Dahlia anemone, a sea anemone

People 

Dahlia Duhaney (born 1970), Jamaican sprinter
Dahlia Lithwick, Canadian contributing editor at Newsweek and senior editor at Slate
Dahlia Ravikovitch (1936-2005), Israeli poet and peace activist
Dahlia Salem (born 1971), American actress

Fictional characters 

Aunt Dahlia Travers, in the Jeeves novels of P.G. Wodehouse
Dahlia Gillespie, in the Silent Hill series
 Dahlia Hawthorne, in the Phoenix Wright: Ace Attorney series
 Dahlia Lynley-Chivers, in the Sookie Stackhouse series
 Dahlia, a nerdy long-eared owl in Angry Birds Stella and The Angry Birds Movie
 Dahlia in The Originals

Horse racing 

Dahlia (horse), a thoroughbred racehorse
Dahlia Stakes, a horse race in Great Britain
Dahlia Stakes (United States), a thoroughbred horse race in Maryland
Dahlia Handicap, a thoroughbred race in California

Other uses 

USS Dahlia (1862), a tugboat in the American Civil War
Dahlia (album), by the band X Japan
"Dahlia" (song), by X Japan
Cyclone Dahlia (2017)

See also
Dalea, a genus of plants
Dalia (disambiguation)
The Black Dahlia (disambiguation)
The Blue Dahlia (disambiguation)